"How a Cowgirl Says Goodbye" is a song co-written and recorded by American country music artist Tracy Lawrence.  It was released in May 1997 as the second single from his album The Coast Is Clear.  It peaked at number 4 on the United States Billboard Hot Country Singles & Tracks chart at number 5 on the Canadian RPM Country Tracks chart.  Lawrence wrote the song with Larry Boone and Paul Nelson.

Content
Deborah Evans Price of Billboard magazine referred to it as a "love gone wrong" song.

Critical reception
Deborah Evans Price, of Billboard magazine reviewed the song favorably, saying that "streams of Mexicali guitar flourishes add flavor." She goes on to say that Lawrence's "self-assured vocal and Cook's skilled production make for an enjoyable outing."

Music video
The music video was directed by Michael Merriman and premiered in mid-1997.

Chart positions
"How a Cowgirl Says Goodbye" debuted at number 67 on the U.S. Billboard Hot Country Singles & Tracks for the week of May 31, 1997.

Year-end charts

References

1997 songs
Tracy Lawrence songs
1997 singles
Songs written by Larry Boone
Songs written by Tracy Lawrence
Songs written by Paul Nelson (songwriter)
Song recordings produced by Don Cook
Atlantic Records singles